One-Trick Pony is a 1980 feature film written by and starring Paul Simon and directed by Robert M. Young. It also stars Blair Brown, Rip Torn, Joan Hackett, Mare Winningham, Michael Pearlman, Lou Reed, and Allen Garfield (credited under his birth name, Allen Goorwitz).

The song "Late in the Evening," from the film's soundtrack, hit number 6 on the Billboard Hot 100 chart, while the title song peaked at number 40. After years of being available only on videocassette and laserdisc, One-Trick Pony was released by Warner Bros. on DVD in 2009.

Synopsis
Paul Simon plays Jonah Levin, a once-popular folk-rock musician who has not had a hit in ten years, and now opens for bands like the B-52's (Levin's bandmates are played by musicians Steve Gadd, Eric Gale, Tony Levin, and Richard Tee, all of whom similarly backed Simon on One-Trick Pony'''s soundtrack album). He is trying to record a new album, but faces a number of obstacles, including an indifferent record-company executive (Rip Torn) who is pressuring him to create a hit record with the help of a trendy producer (Lou Reed). Jonah is also trying to restore his relationship with his estranged wife, Marion (Blair Brown), and young son, Matty (Michael Pearlman).

Production
The title derives from a colloquial American expression meaning a person specializing in only one area, having only one talent, or of limited ability.

The film is not considered autobiographical, though the story makes use some of Simon's experiences in the music business. There has been some disagreement on the story's underpinning. Biographer Laura Jackson felt that the film may have been based on experiences in Simon's professional and personal life, though Dave Marsh in a Rolling Stone review saw similarities with Simon's personality, but not with his life and career. However, the character of Walter Fox, the record company executive portrayed by Rip Torn, is regarded as reflecting some of Simon's experiences in moving away from CBS Records, his former label, in the 1970s. (Simon went to Warner Bros. Records at the time of the film's release. The label, at the time owned by the film's distributor, acquired the masters of Simon's CBS catalog that same year.) The film featured one of the last appearances of the original members of The Lovin' Spoonful, in a simulated TV show appearance.

The Paul Simon album One-Trick Pony was released concurrently with the movie. All of the songs on the album are featured in the film, though some are presented with a slightly different mix, e.g., "Jonah" features a harmonica solo (probably by Toots Thielemans) that is missing from the album version. The film also features "Soft Parachutes," Jonah Levin's sole hit as a recording artist, which is included as a bonus track on the album's 2004 reissue.

Cast

Actors
Paul Simon as Jonah Levin
Blair Brown as Marion Levin
Rip Torn as Walter Fox
Joan Hackett as Lonnie Fox
Allen Garfield as Cal van Damp
Mare Winningham as Modeena Dandridge
Michael Pearlman as Matty Levin
Lou Reed as Steve Kunelian
Steve Gadd as Danny Duggin
Eric Gale as Lee-Andrew Parker
Tony Levin as John Dibatista
Richard Tee as Clarence Franklin
Harry Shearer as Bernie Wepner
Daniel Stern as Hare Krishna

Musicians
Sam & Dave
The Lovin' Spoonful
Tiny Tim
The B-52's
David Sanborn

Reception
Reviews for the film were mixed. Writing in the New York Times, critic Janet Maslin called the movie "an odd mixture of inordinately graceful touches and sweeping, clumsy ones". Stephen Holden in Rolling Stone'' called it "a morose little art film". However, critic Roger Ebert praised the film as "a wonderful movie, an affectionate character study with a lot of good music in it". The film was commercially unsuccessful, grossing less than $900,000 despite a budget of $8 million.

External links

References

1980 films
1980 drama films
American drama films
American rock music films
Films directed by Robert M. Young
Films set in Cleveland
Films shot in Cleveland
Paul Simon
Warner Bros. films
1980s English-language films
1980s American films